Under Western Skies is a compilation album of phonograph records by Bing Crosby  released in 1941 featuring songs with western themes such as "Empty Saddles" and "Tumbling Tumbleweeds".

Track listing
These previously issued songs were featured on a 5-disc, 78 rpm album set, Decca Album A-250.

References

Bing Crosby compilation albums
1941 compilation albums
Decca Records compilation albums
Country albums by American artists
Country music compilation albums